Lusignan is a community in Demerara-Mahaica region of Guyana and approximately 16 km from the capital city Georgetown. Located on the East Coast of Demerara, it has population of 1,868 persons as of 2012 mostly Indo-Guyanese. 

The village is sustained by subsistence farming and fishing. Ecotourism is also an emerging industry.

Its most famous expatriates are Ramkumar and Tapearee Singh who moved to Lusignan during the disturbance in the 1960s. Singh moved his house, board by board, from Golden Grove - with help from Stella the Donkey. Singh was a gentleman farmer with extensive land holdings in the Golden Grove, back dam and Georgetown. They parented 11 children.

Services
It is home to the Lusignan Golf Course, Guyana's only golf course, and there is also a community centre which houses the Lusignan Cricket Club and a Dental Surgery. The village constitutes a market square, supermarket, and pharmacy, and one of the Guyana's five maximum security prisons. Transportation for the village is via a railway embankment and the major East Coast highway, and connects the community to the capital city.

The village has a nursery and primary school, and secondary schooling is provided in Annandale.

Lusignan Massacre 
The community was brought to international attention following what has become known as the Lusignan Massacre, in which 11 persons, including 5 children, were killed after a group of heavily armed gunmen led by Rondell "Fineman" Rawlins stormed the village.

References

Populated places in Demerara-Mahaica